The  is a special technique to make microblades, proposed by Japanese scholar Yoshizaki in 1961, based on his finds in some Upper Palaeolithic sites in Hokkaido, Japan, which date from c. 13,000 bp.

To make microblades by this technique, a large biface is made into a core which looks like a tall carinated scraper. Then one lateral edge of the bifacial core is removed, producing at first a triangular spall. After, more edge removals will produce ski spalls of parallel surfaces. 

This technique was also used from Mongolia to Kamchatka Peninsula during the later Pleistocene.

References
 江坂輝爾, 芹沢長介, 坂詰秀一, 『新日本考古学小辞典』（2005）p416
 千葉英一, 吉崎昌一, 横山英介, 「湧別技法」 『考古学ジャーナル』（1984）p229

Lithics
Archaeology of Japan